A cartoon war occurs when two or more parties knowingly or unknowingly spread animated propaganda that intimidates the other side and may refer to:
Jyllands-Posten Muhammad cartoons controversy, cartoons that depict a rendition of the prophet Muhammad
American propaganda during World War II
Propaganda in Japan during the Second Sino-Japanese War and World War II